Georgi Andonov (born 28 June 1983 in Plovdiv) is a Bulgarian footballer who plays as a forward.

Career
Andonov's first club was Botev Plovdiv. With Botev he played 112 games and scored 12 goals.

In 2006, Cherno More Varna signed Andonov to a four-year deal for a €100,000. During a 2008–09 season, after a few poor performances along with the impressive form of Miroslav Manolov and Yordan Yurukov, Andonov found regular starting positions in attack hard to find. In January 2009, he was loaned in his previously club Botev to the end of the season.

On 3 July 2009, Andonov signed a contract with Beroe Stara Zagora.

In May 2010 Andonov signed a two-year deal with Chernomorets Burgas.

In February 2012, Andonov was released from his contract and returned to Beroe Stara Zagora as a free agent. He scored a hat-trick in the opening game of the 2012–13 season against Botev Vratsa on 11 August. On 15 May 2013, Andonov led Beroe out as captain in the 2013 Bulgarian Cup Final, which they won 6–4 after penalties against Levski Sofia, as Andonov collected his second Bulgarian Cup winner's medal.

On 12 June 2018, Andonov signed with Second League club Arda.

In May 2021, Andonov moved to Asenovets.

Honours

Club
Beroe Stara Zagora
Bulgarian Cup (2): 2009–10, 2012–13
Bulgarian Supercup (1): 2013

References

External links
 

Bulgarian footballers
1983 births
Living people
Footballers from Plovdiv
Association football forwards
First Professional Football League (Bulgaria) players
Second Professional Football League (Bulgaria) players
TFF First League players
Botev Plovdiv players
PFC Cherno More Varna players
PFC Beroe Stara Zagora players
PFC Chernomorets Burgas players
Denizlispor footballers
FC Vereya players
FC Arda Kardzhali players
FC Tsarsko Selo Sofia players
FC Hebar Pazardzhik players
FC Levski Karlovo players
Bulgarian expatriate footballers
Expatriate footballers in Turkey
Bulgarian expatriate sportspeople in Turkey